Transition, in genetics and molecular biology, refers to a point mutation that changes a purine nucleotide to another purine (A ↔ G), or a pyrimidine nucleotide to another pyrimidine (C ↔ T). Approximately two out of three single nucleotide polymorphisms (SNPs) are transitions.

Transitions can be caused by oxidative deamination and tautomerization. Although there are twice as many possible transversions, transitions appear more often in genomes, possibly due to the molecular mechanisms that generate them.

5-Methylcytosine is more prone to transition than unmethylated cytosine, due to spontaneous deamination. This mechanism is important because it dictates the rarity of CpG islands.

See also
 Transversion

References

External links

 Diagram at mun.ca

Mutation